Edouard Kutter may refer to:

 Edouard Kutter (1934) (born 1934), Luxembourg photographer and publisher
 Edouard Kutter (1887) (1887–1978), Luxembourg photographer